Myer Myers (1723–1795) was a silversmith who lived and worked in New York City.  He was a Jewish-American of Ashkenazi origin and a member of Congregation Shearith Israel, for whom be produced many works.  Historians believe he was an apprentice of the Huguenot silversmith Charles le Roux (silversmith).  He registered as a Freeman in 1746, and partnered with Benjamin Halsted from 1756-1766 as Halsted & Myers.  380 of his works survive in museums and private collections.

References

Silversmiths
American silversmiths
American Sephardic Jews
People from New York City